The Community Basketball Association (CBA – Pilipinas / CBA – Philippines) was a regional-based grassroots basketball tournament based in the Philippines. Founded in June 2018, the league aimed to become an avenue to scout and expose young basketball players from various places across the country. The league was founded by former actor and model-turned-director and basketball enthusiast Carlo Maceda.

16 teams from across Luzon area (Binangonan, Bulacan, Caloocan, Marikina, Manila, General Trias, Malabon, Nueva Ecija, Parañaque, Pasig, Rizal, (Team A & B) Quezon City, San Juan, San Mateo, Valenzuela) participated in the league's 1st Founder's Cup with San Juan Knights EXILE winning the title. All games aired on IBC-13 and ZOE Broadcasting Network's Light TV. 

After suspending their Next-18 tournament due to the onset of the COVID-19 pandemic in March 2020, no announcements were made on when will the league resume its operations.

Teams

East Division
Palayan City Capitals
Binangonan Challengers
Batang Maynila - Manila Sausage Kings
Tarlac Troopers
Arceegee - Malabon Squad
Nueva Ecija Golden Grains

West Division
San Juan Knights NAVY - Go For Gold
Mabalacat Tribes
Caloocan Hurricane Saints
Parañaque High Flyers
RIZABA Patriots - One Big Wash
Quezon City - Cleon and Clyde

CBA NEXT U-18 Teams (2019-2020)
Binangonan Lake Hounds
Batang Maynila Junior Sausage Kings
Caloocan Hurricane Big Fans
Parañaque Perpetual Meatiniks
San Juan Mapua - Go For Gold
Quezon City - Batang Kyusi Black Mamba
Marikina Shoeters
Pasig Spartans
Rizal - LSGH Tankers
RIZABA - Fatima Indus Real Estate
Nueva Ecija Dragons
Nueva Ecija Golden Plains
Nueva Ecija Rainmakers
Nueva Ecija Warriors
Arceegee - Malabon Squad
Valenzuela MYO Selection

References

Basketball leagues in the Philippines
Sports leagues established in 2019
2019 establishments in the Philippines
Intercontinental Broadcasting Corporation original programming
Defunct basketball leagues in the Philippines